WWE SmackDown! vs. Raw (subtitled Exciting Pro Wrestling 6 in Japan) is a professional wrestling video game developed by Yuke's and published by THQ for the PlayStation 2 on November 2, 2004 in North America. It is the sixth installment of professional wrestling promotion World Wrestling Entertainment (WWE)'s video game series, the sequel to 2003's WWE SmackDown! Here Comes the Pain, and the first game to be released under the SmackDown! vs. Raw title. The game series was rebranded after the introduction of the brand extension which divided WWE's roster into two brands, the latter brand in the game's title being named after WWE's weekly Monday Night Raw program. 

WWE SmackDown! vs. Raw was succeeded in 2005 by WWE SmackDown! vs. Raw 2006.

Gameplay

The game is largely similar to its predecessor, but adds some key features.

Several new gameplay features are introduced, including pre-match and mid-match minigames. The pre-match mini-games are randomly chosen before every singles match and include a test of strength, a stare down, and a shoving match. Several mid-match mini-games include the chop battle, and a spanking mini-game for female wrestlers in bra and panties matches. The meter mechanic from the chop battles are retained, but the player must perfectly time the button press three consecutive times to win. If the player does so, a cut scene of the two female wrestlers kissing is played.

The ability to sustain a submission till the count of 5 once a rope break had been reached was also implemented. The game features several arenas based on pay-per-views held by WWE in 2003 and 2004, as well as arenas based on each weekly WWE television show.

Also added to the game was the Clean/Dirty system, which influenced each wrestler's tactics. Players can choose if the wrestler is clean, dirty or neutral. A clean or dirty wrestler has a unique meter that can be filled up by performing special clean/dirty actions or moves.

WWE SmackDown! vs. Raw also includes a redone WWE PPV (Pay-Per-View) mode from its past games where the player can play sample PPVs based on real life match cards from 2004, or create a PPV of their own by booking matches and choosing match types with any superstar, legend or created superstar in the game. Created championships could also be waged in the created PPVs. Before playing the PPV, the game would show a generic highlight reel featuring two of the superstars in the main event of the show. Play-by-play commentary was also improved, with the commentary beginning to improve and sync up with the matches more.

The game also featured an all-new Create-a-Championship mode, in which the player can create and defend the title in their created PPVs. The game also includes the Create-A-Wrestler mode from previous games where the created superstar's movesets, attributes, entrances, and brand could be customized. The create mode was improved from the previous game. Stables could also be created featuring any wrestler and entrances could also be customized.

A new Challenge mode provides gamers with opportunities to challenge themselves at different difficulty levels. In addition, several challenges put gamers in memorable matches from the past and beating these challenges will help unlock alternate attires and arenas.

SmackDown vs. Raw was also the first installment in the series to feature an Online mode; however, only Single or Bra & Panties matches can be played.

Reception 
The game received a "Platinum" sales award from the Entertainment and Leisure Software Publishers Association (ELSPA), indicating sales of at least 300,000 copies in the United Kingdom.

Critical 

The game received a score of 80/100 on review aggregator Metacritic, indicating "generally favorable reviews".

Accolades

See also

List of licensed wrestling video games
List of fighting games
List of video games in the WWE 2K Games series

References

External links

2004 video games
Multiplayer and single-player video games
PlayStation 2 games
PlayStation 2-only games
Video games developed in Japan
WWE SmackDown video games
WWE video games
WWE Raw video games
THQ games
Yuke's games
Professional wrestling games

ca:WWE SmackDown vs. Raw 2009